Sheydanak (also Romanized as Sheydānak) is a village in Now Bandegan Rural District, Now Bandegan District, Fasa County, Fars Province, Iran. At the 2006 census, its population was 78, in 22 families.

References 

Populated places in Fasa County